Huilong Township is a township of Jianyang City in northwestern Fujian province, China, located about  northeast of downtown Jianyang as the crow flies. , it has 12 villages under its administration.

See also 
 List of township-level divisions of Fujian

References 

Township-level divisions of Fujian